The following is a list of television programs formerly or currently broadcast by HGTV.A Place In The Sun

Current programming

House Hunters (1999–present)
House Hunters International (2006–present)
Love It or List It (2011–present)
Brother vs. Brother (2013–present)
Beachfront Bargain Hunt (2013–present)
Island Life (2015–present)
My Lottery Dream Home (2015–present)
Mexico Life (2016–present)
Home Town (2016–present)
Good Bones (2016–present)
Fixer to Fabulous (2017–present)
Windy City Rehab (2019–present)
Unsellable Houses (2019–present)
Christina on the Coast (2019–present)
Property Brothers: Forever Home (2019–present)
Selling the Big Easy (2019–present)
Rock the Block (2019–present)
100 Day Dream Home (2020–present)
Flipping 101 w/ Tarek El Moussa (2020–present)
Celebrity IOU (2020–present)
Renovation Island (2020–present)
Vacation House Rules (2020–present)
Help! I Wrecked My House (2020–present)
Everything But the House (2021–present)
Farmhouse Fixer (2021–present)
No Demo Reno (2021–present)
Bargain Block (2021–present)
Inside Out (2021–present)
Home Town Takeover (2021–present)
Battle on the Beach (2021–present)
Houses with History (2021–present)
The Nate & Jeremiah Home Project (2021–present)
Home Inspector Joe (2021–present)
Holmes Family Rescue (2021–present)
Tough Love with Hilary Farr (2021–present)
Fix My Flip (2022–present)
I Bought a Dump... Now What? (2022–present)
Why the Heck Did I Buy This House? (2022–present)
Married to Real Estate (2022–present)
Ugliest House in America (2022–present)
Build It Forward (2022–present)
Mash-Up Our Home (2022–present)
Fixer to Fabulous: Welcome Inn (2022–present)
Building Roots (2022–present)
Home Town Kickstart Presented by People (2022–present)
Lil John Wants to Do What? (2022–present)
The Great Giveback with Melissa McCarthy and Jenna Perusich (2022–present)
Buy It or Build It (2022–present)
Steal This House (2022–present)
Flip to a Million (2022–present)
First Home Fix (2022–present)
Good Bones: Risky Business (2022–present)
Renovation Impossible (2022–present)
The Renovator (2022–present)
Rehab Addict Lake House Rescue (2022–present)
Renovation Face-Off (2022–present)
Luxe for Less (2022–present)
Battle of the Bling (2022–present)
Rico to the Rescue (2023–present)
Christina in the Country (2023–present)
Down Home Fab (2023–present)

Specials
HGTV Dream Home (1997–present)
HGTV Urban Oasis (2010–present)
HGTV Smart Home (2013–present)

Upcoming programming
The Flipping El Moussas (March 2, 2023)
Renovation 911 (March 28, 2023)
Fix My Frankenhouse (2022–23 season)
Revealed (2022–23 season)
Small Town Potential (2022–23 season)
Renovation Wild (2023)

Former programming

The Carol Duvall Show (1994–05)
Gardening by the Yard (1996–09)
Surprise Gardener (1998–03)
Designing for the Sexes (1998–11)
Curb Appeal (1999–13)
Dream House (2000–08)
Designers' Challenge (2001–09)
Ultimate Collectors (2002–03)
Landscapers' Challenge (2002–08)
Design on a Dime (2003–13)
Holmes on Homes (2004–10)
Designed to Sell (2004–11)
FreeStyle (2005–13)
My First Place (2005–13)
Creative Juice (2006–08)
Hidden Potential (2006–09; 2017–20)
Over Your Head (2006–11)
Don't Sweat It (2006–11)
HGTV Star (2006–13)
Property Virgins (2006–16)
Deserving Design (2007)
Bought & Sold (2007–09)
Living with Ed (2007–09, moved to Planet Green)
Color Splash (2007–12)
The Stagers (2008–09)
Myles of Style (2008–09)
HGTV Showdown (2008–09)
House Detective (2008–12)
HGTV Green Home (2008–2010)
Desperate to Buy (2009)
The Property Shop (2009)
The Unsellables (2009)
Leader of the Pack (2009)
HGTV's $250,000 Challenge  (2009)
Man Land (2009)
For Rent (2009–11)
Bang for Your Buck (2009–11)
Dear Genevieve (2009–12)
Real Estate Intervention (2009–13)
Home Rules (2010)
Marriage Under Construction (2010)
My First Sale (2010)
Tough as Nails (2010)
The Antonio Treatment (2010–11)
The Outdoor Room with Jamie Durie (2010–11)
Curb Appeal: The Block (2010–12)
Million Dollar Rooms (2010–12)
All American Handyman (2010–12)
Holmes Inspection (2010–12)
Selling New York (2010–14)
Candice Tells All (2011)
Cash & Cari (2011)
Secrets from a Stylist (2011)
Sarah's Summer House (2011)
HGTV'd (2011)
Run My Makeover (2011)
Showhouse Showdown (2011)
House Hunters on Vacation (2011–12)
My Yard Goes Disney (2011–12)
Home by Novogratz (2011–12)
Kitchen Cousins (2011–12)
Donna Decorates Dallas (2011–12)
Dina's Party (2011–12)
Mom Caves (2011–12)
Interiors Inc. (2011–12)
HGTV's Great Rooms (2011–12)
My First Renovation (2011–12)
My House, Your Money (2011–12)
Weekends With Luis (2011–12)
Design Wars (2011–12)
Room Crashers (2011–13)
The High Low Project (2011–13)
Beyond Spelling Manor (2011–13)
Selling LA (2011–14)
Property Brothers (2011–19)
Price This Place (2012)
Living Abroad (2012)
White Room Challenge (2012)
Selling London (2012)
Natural Born Sellers (2012)
HGTV Design Star All Stars (2012)
Shop This Room (2012)
Making House (2012)
Flea Market Flip (2012–13, moved to Great American Country)
Celebrity at Home (2012–13)
You Live in What? (2012–13)
Elbow Room (2012–13)
Home Strange Home (2012–13)
Going Yard (2012–14)
Extreme Homes (2012–15)
Buying and Selling (2012–19)
House Hunters Renovation (2012–20)
Cousins on Call (2013)
West End Salvage (2013)
Staged to Perfection (2013)
Renovate to Rent (2013)
Catastrophe Inc. (2013)
Power Broker (2013)
Rent or Buy (2013)
Scoring the Deal (2013–14)
Flip It to Win It (2013–14)
Cousins Undercover (2013–14)
Renovation Raiders (2013–15)
Sold on the Spot (2013–15)
House Hunters International Renovation (2013–16)
Fixer Upper (2013–18)
Love It or List It, Too (2013–19)
Hawaii Life (2013–21)
Island Hunters (2013–21)
Flip or Flop (2013–22)
Beat the House (2014)
Brian Boitano Project (2014)
Flipping the Block (2014)
My Big Family Renovation (2014)
The Jennie Garth Project (2014)
A Sale of Two Cities (2014–15)
House Hunters Off the Grid (2014–15)
Vacation House for Free (2014–16)
Living Big Sky (2014–16)
Property Brothers At Home (2014–17)
Tiny House Hunters (2014–17)
Log Cabin Living (2014–19)
Caribbean Life (2014–20)
Lakefront Bargain Hunt (2014–21)
Half-Price Paradise (2015)
Mark & Derek's Excellent Flip (2015)
Flipping the Heartland (2015)
Beach Flip (2015)
Flip or Flop Follow-Up (2015)
Rehab Addict: Detroit (2015)
Build Small, Live Anywhere (2015)
Ellen's Design Challenge (2015–16)
Five Day Flip (2015–16)
Hunting Vintage (2015–16)
America's Most Desperate Kitchens (2015–16)
Vintage Flip (2015–17)
Listed Sisters (2015–18)
Flipping Virgins (2015–18)
Masters of Flip (2016)
Container Homes (2016)
Welcome Back Potter (2016)
Brothers Take New Orleans (2016)
We Bought the Farm (2016–17)
Desert Flippers (2016–18)
House Hunters Family (2016–18)
Mountain Life (2016–18)
Rustic Rehab (2016–18)
Flip or Flop Atlanta (2016–18)
Flip or Flop Vegas (2016–19)
Restored by the Fords (2016–19)
Beach Hunters (2016–21)
House Hunters Outside the Box (2017)
Flip or Flop Fort Worth (2017–18)
Fixer Upper Behind the Design (2017–18)
Tiny Paradise (2017–18)
Best House on the Block (2017–18)
Boise Boys (2017–19)
How Close Can I Beach? (2017–19)
Mom & Me (2017–19)
Mountain Mamas (2017–19)
My House Is Your House (2017–19)
Mediterranean Life (2017–21)
Music City Fix (2018)
My Aloha Dream Home (2018)
Flip or Flop Nashville (2018–19)
Bahamas Life (2018–20)
Should I Stay or Go? (2018–20)
Hot Properties: San Diego (2018–20)
Say Yes to the Nest (2019)
Roommate Hunters (2019)
What You Get for Your Money (2019)
City vs. Burbs (2019)
Best. Pool. Ever. (2019)
Pool Hunters (2019)
Supersize My Pool (2019)
My First Place (2019)
Going for Sold (2019)
Hawaii Hunters (2019)
A Very Brady Renovation (2019)
Off the Grid on the Beach (2019–20)
One of a Kind (2019–20)
Build Me Up (2019–20)
Jungle Life (2019–20)
Bargain Mansions (2020, moved to DIY Network)
Nate and Jeremiah: Save My House (2020)
Extreme Makeover: Home Edition (2020)
Crowded House (2020)
My Lottery Dream House International (2020)
Design at Your Door (2020)
Generation Renovation: Lake House (2020)
Making It Home With Kortney & Dave (2020)
Martha Knows Best (2020)
Backyard Takeover (2020)
Renovation, Inc. (2020)
Bizarre Builds (2020)
My Big Italian Adventure (2020)
Biggest Little Christmas Showdown (2020)
Self-Made Mansions (2020–21)
House in a Hurry (2020–21)
Hot Mess House (2020–21)
Flipping Across America (2020–21)
Escape to the Chateau (2020–21)
Beach Around the World (2020–22)
Ty Breaker (2021)
Rehab Addict Rescue (2021)
Home Again with the Fords (2021)
$50K Three Ways (2021)
Happily Wherever (2021)
Breaking Bland (2021)
Cash in the Attic (2021)
Cheap Old Houses (2021)
Renovation, Inc: The Lake House (2021)
Curb Appeal Xtreme (2021)
Outgrown (2021)
Flipping Showdown (2021)
Call the Closer (2021)
Two Steps Home (2021–22)
Renovation Goldmine (2022)
Saving the Manor (2022)
Unfinished Business (2022)
Moving for Love (2022)

References

Lists of television series by network